The 1987–88 FDGB-Pokal was the 37th edition of the East German Cup. The competition was won by Berliner FC Dynamo, who beat FC Carl Zeiss Jena 2-0 after extra time.

Preliminary round

First round

Second round

Round of 16

Quarter-final

Semi-final

Final

External links 
 DDR Football 1987/88 at rsssf.com

FDGB-Pokal seasons
East
Cup